Sadayuki (written:  or ) is a masculine Japanese given name. Notable people with the name include:

, Japanese sumo wrestler
, Japanese businessman

See also
48624 Sadayuki, a main-belt asteroid

Japanese masculine given names